"Low" was the third single to be released from the Foo Fighters' fourth album One by One, released in 2002. It was released as a single in 2003. Dave Grohl described "Low" as "the kind of song that you pray would be a single. (...) It’s the one that everybody likes, but there’s just no way ’cause it’s too weird." The song begun as an instrumental demo written by Grohl and drummer Taylor Hawkins in Hawkins' home studio in Topanga, California, some time after the 2002 Coachella Valley Music and Arts Festival.

The official music video features Grohl and Jack Black entering a motel, where they proceed to get drunk, cross-dress and wreck the motel room. Originally, Grohl wanted to just film Black dancing in drag for four minutes with no edits, but director Jesse Peretz convinced him otherwise, instead creating the storyline about rednecks in lingerie at a motel room. The video was banned on MTV for its content.

A live version recorded on December 4, 2002 at the Oslo Spektrum was released with the Special Norwegian Edition of the One by One album.

The B-Side, "Never Talking to You Again", is a Hüsker Dü cover, originally from the album Zen Arcade.

Track listing

CD (Australia)
"Low" - 4:33
"Enough Space" (Live in Copenhagen, Denmark, 5 December 2002)
"Never Talking to You Again" (Hüsker Dü cover) (Live in Hamburg, Germany 1 Dec 2002)
"Low" video (CD-ROM)
CD-ROM bonus clip "Chris' Hair"
NOTE: The track listing on the Australian single is incorrectly labelled, with Enough Space and Never Talking to You Again in switched play order

DVD/EP (U.S./Canada) 
 "Low" (Video)
 "Times Like These" (Video)
 "Times Like These" (UK video)
 "Times Like These" (Acoustic video)

CD1 (UK)
"Low"
"Never Talking to You Again" (Hüsker Dü cover) (Live in Hamburg, Germany, 1 Dec 2002)
CD-ROM bonus clip "Chris' Hair"

CD2 (UK)
"Low"
"Enough Space" (Live in Copenhagen, Denmark, 5 December 2002)
"Low" video (CD-ROM)

7-inch (UK)
"Low"
"Never Talking to You Again"  (Hüsker Dü cover) (Live in Germany 1 Dec 2002)

Chart positions

References

Foo Fighters songs
2003 singles
RCA Records singles
Song recordings produced by Nick Raskulinecz
Songs written by Dave Grohl
Songs written by Taylor Hawkins
Songs written by Nate Mendel
Songs written by Chris Shiflett
2002 songs